In linguistic morphology, inflection (or inflexion) is a process of word formation in which a word is modified to express different grammatical categories such as tense, case, voice, aspect, person, number, gender, mood, animacy, and definiteness. The inflection of verbs is called conjugation, and one can refer to the inflection of nouns, adjectives, adverbs, pronouns, determiners, participles, prepositions and postpositions, numerals, articles, etc., as declension.

An inflection expresses grammatical categories with affixation (such as prefix, suffix, infix, circumfix, and transfix), apophony (as Indo-European ablaut), or other modifications. For example, the Latin verb , meaning "I will lead", includes the suffix , expressing person (first), number (singular), and tense-mood (future indicative or present subjunctive). The use of this suffix is an inflection. In contrast, in the English clause "I will lead", the word lead is not inflected for any of person, number, or tense; it is simply the bare form of a verb. The inflected form of a word often contains both one or more free morphemes (a unit of meaning which can stand by itself as a word), and one or more bound morphemes (a unit of meaning which cannot stand alone as a word). For example, the English word cars is a noun that is inflected for number, specifically to express the plural; the content morpheme car is unbound because it could stand alone as a word, while the suffix -s is bound because it cannot stand alone as a word. These two morphemes together form the inflected word cars.

Words that are never subject to inflection are said to be invariant; for example, the English verb must is an invariant item: it never takes a suffix or changes form to signify a different grammatical category. Its categories can be determined only from its context. Languages that seldom make use of inflection, such as English, are said to be analytic. Analytic languages that do not make use of derivational morphemes, such as Standard Chinese, are said to be isolating.

Requiring the forms or inflections of more than one word in a sentence to be compatible with each other according to the rules of the language is known as concord or agreement. For example, in "the man jumps", "man" is a singular noun, so "jump" is constrained in the present tense to use the third person singular suffix "s".

Languages that have some degree of inflection are synthetic languages. These can be highly inflected (such as Latin, Greek, Biblical Hebrew, and Sanskrit), or slightly inflected (such as English, Dutch, Persian). Languages that are so inflected that a sentence can consist of a single highly inflected word (such as many Native American languages) are called polysynthetic languages. Languages in which each inflection conveys only a single grammatical category, such as Finnish, are known as agglutinative languages, while languages in which a single inflection can convey multiple grammatical roles (such as both nominative case and plural, as in Latin and German) are called fusional.

Examples in English
In English most nouns are inflected for number with the inflectional plural affix -s (as in "dog" → "dog-s"), and most English verbs are inflected for tense with the inflectional past tense affix -ed (as in "call" → "call-ed"). English also inflects verbs by affixation to mark the third person singular in the present tense (with -s), and the present participle (with -ing). English short adjectives are inflected to mark comparative and superlative forms (with -er and -est respectively).

There are nine inflectional affixes in the English language.

Despite the march toward regularization, modern English retains traces of its ancestry, with a minority of its words still using inflection by ablaut (sound change, mostly in verbs) and umlaut (a particular type of sound change, mostly in nouns), as well as long-short vowel alternation. For example:

 Write, wrote, written (marking by ablaut variation, and also suffixing in the participle)
 Sing, sang, sung (ablaut)
 Foot, feet (marking by umlaut variation)
 Mouse, mice (umlaut)
 Child, children (ablaut, and also suffixing in the plural)

For details, see English plural, English verbs, and English irregular verbs.

Regular and irregular inflection 
When a given word class is subject to inflection in a particular language, there are generally one or more standard patterns of inflection (the paradigms described below) that words in that class may follow. Words which follow such a standard pattern are said to be regular; those that inflect differently are called irregular.

For instance, many languages that feature verb inflection have both regular verbs and irregular verbs. In English, regular verbs form their past tense and past participle with the ending -[e]d. Therefore, verbs like play, arrive and enter are regular, while verbs like sing, keep and go are irregular. Irregular verbs often preserve patterns that were regular in past forms of the language, but which have now become anomalous; in rare cases, there are regular verbs that were irregular in past forms of the language. (For more details see English verbs and English irregular verbs.)

Irregularities can have four basic causes:

 principal parts: These are generally considered to have been formed independently of one another, so the student must memorize them when learning a new word. Example: Latin  → Spanish .
 strong vs. weak inflection: In some cases, two inflection systems exist, conventionally classified as "strong" and "weak." For instance, English and German have weak verbs that form the past tense and past participle by adding an ending (English jump → jumped, German  → ) and strong verbs that change vowel, and in some cases form the past participle by adding  (English swim → swam, swum, German  →). Ancient Greek verbs are likewise said to have had a first aorist and a second aorist.
 suppletion: The "irregular" form was originally derived from a different root (English person → people). The comparative and superlative forms of good in many languages display this phenomenon.

For more details on some of the considerations that apply to regularly and irregularly inflected forms, see the article on regular and irregular verbs.

Declension and conjugation

Two traditional grammatical terms refer to inflections of specific word classes:

 Inflecting a noun, pronoun, adjective, adverb, article or determiner is known as declining it. The forms may express number, case, gender or degree of comparison.
 Inflecting a verb is called conjugating it. The forms may express tense, mood, voice, aspect, person, or number.

An organized list of the inflected forms of a given lexeme or root word is called its declension if it is a noun, or its conjugation if it is a verb.

Below is the declension of the English pronoun I, which is inflected for case and number.

The pronoun who is also inflected according to case. Its declension is defective, in the sense that it lacks a reflexive form.

The following table shows the conjugation of the verb to arrive in the indicative mood: suffixes inflect it for person, number, and tense:

The non-finite forms arrive (bare infinitive), arrived (past participle) and arriving (gerund/present participle), although not inflected for person or number, can also be regarded as part of the conjugation of the verb to arrive. Compound verb forms, such as I have arrived, I had arrived, or I will arrive, can be included also in the conjugation of the verb for didactic purposes, but they are not overt inflections of arrive. The formula for deriving the covert form, in which the relevant inflections do not occur in the main verb, is

pronoun + conjugated auxiliary verb + non-finite form of main verb.

Inflectional paradigm
An inflectional paradigm refers to a pattern (usually a set of inflectional endings), where a class of words follow the same pattern. Nominal inflectional paradigms are called declensions, and verbal inflectional paradigms are termed conjugations. For instance, there are five types of Latin declension. Words that belong to the first declension usually end in -a and are usually feminine. These words share a common inflectional framework. In Old English, nouns are divided into two major categories of declension, the strong and weak ones, as shown below:

The terms "strong declension" and "weak declension" are primarily relevant to well-known dependent-marking languages (such as the Indo-European languages, or Japanese). In dependent-marking languages, nouns in adpositional (prepositional or postpositional) phrases can carry inflectional morphemes.

In head-marking languages, the adpositions can carry the inflection in adpositional phrases. This means that these languages will have inflected adpositions. In Western Apache (San Carlos dialect), the postposition -ká’ 'on' is inflected for person and number with prefixes:

Traditional grammars have specific terms for inflections of nouns and verbs but not for those of adpositions.

Compared to derivation

Inflection is the process of adding inflectional morphemes that modify a verb's tense, mood, aspect, voice, person, or number or a noun's case, gender, or number, rarely affecting the word's meaning or class. Examples of applying inflectional morphemes to words are adding -s to the root dog to form dogs and adding -ed to wait to form waited.

In contrast, derivation is the process of adding derivational morphemes, which create a new word from existing words and change the semantic meaning or the part of speech of the affected word, such as by changing a noun to a verb.

Distinctions between verbal moods are mainly indicated by derivational morphemes.

Words are rarely listed in dictionaries on the basis of their inflectional morphemes (in which case they would be lexical items). However, they often are listed on the basis of their derivational morphemes. For instance, English dictionaries list readable and readability, words with derivational suffixes, along with their root read. However, no traditional English dictionary lists book as one entry and books as a separate entry; the same goes for jump and jumped.

Inflectional morphology
Languages that add inflectional morphemes to words are sometimes called inflectional languages, which is a synonym for inflected languages. Morphemes may be added in several different ways:

 Affixation, or simply adding morphemes onto the word without changing the root;
 Reduplication, repeating all or part of a word to change its meaning;
 Alternation, exchanging one sound for another in the root (usually vowel sounds, as in the ablaut process found in Germanic strong verbs and the umlaut often found in nouns, among others);
 Suprasegmental variations, such as of stress, pitch or tone, where no sounds are added or changed but the intonation and relative strength of each sound is altered regularly. For an example, see Initial-stress-derived noun.

Inflection through reduplication
Reduplication is a morphological process where a constituent is repeated. The direct repetition of a word or root is called total reduplication (or full reduplication). The repetition of a segment is referred to as partial reduplication. Reduplication can serve both derivational and inflectional functions. A few examples are given below:

Inflection through tone change
Palancar and Léonard provided an example with Tlatepuzco Chinantec (an Oto-Manguean language spoken in Southern Mexico), where tones are able to distinguish mood, person, and number:

Case can be distinguished with tone as well, as in Maasai language (a Nilo-Saharan language spoken in Kenya and Tanzania) (Hyman, 2016):

In various languages

Indo-European languages (fusional)

Because the Proto-Indo-European language was highly inflected, all of its descendant Indo-European languages, such as Albanian, Armenian, English, German, Ukrainian, Russian, Persian, Kurdish, Italian, Irish, Spanish, French, Hindi, Marathi, Urdu, Bengali, and Nepali, are inflected to a greater or lesser extent. In general, older Indo-European languages such as Latin, Ancient Greek, Old English, Old Norse, Old Church Slavonic and Sanskrit are extensively inflected because of their temporal proximity to Proto-Indo-European. Deflexion has caused modern versions of some Indo-European languages that were previously highly inflected to be much less so; an example is Modern English, as compared to Old English. In general, languages where deflexion occurs replace inflectional complexity with more rigorous word order, which provides the lost inflectional details. Most Slavic languages and some Indo-Aryan languages are an exception to the general Indo-European deflexion trend, continuing to be highly inflected (in some cases acquiring additional inflectional complexity and grammatical genders, as in Czech & Marathi).

English

Old English was a moderately inflected language, using an extensive case system similar to that of modern Icelandic or German. Middle and Modern English lost progressively more of the Old English inflectional system. Modern English is considered a weakly inflected language, since its nouns have only vestiges of inflection (plurals, the pronouns), and its regular verbs have only four forms: an inflected form for the past indicative and subjunctive (looked), an inflected form for the third-person-singular present indicative (looks), an inflected form for the present participle (looking), and an uninflected form for everything else (look). While the English possessive indicator 's (as in "Jennifer's book") is a remnant of the Old English genitive case suffix, it is now considered by syntacticians not to be a suffix but a clitic, although some linguists argue that it has properties of both.

Scandinavian languages 
Old Norse was inflected, but modern Swedish, Norwegian, and Danish have lost much of their inflection. Grammatical case has largely died out with the exception of pronouns, just like English. However, adjectives, nouns, determiners and articles still have different forms according to grammatical number and grammatical gender. Danish and Swedish only inflect for two different genders while Norwegian has to some degree retained the feminine forms and inflects for three grammatical genders like Icelandic. However in comparison to Icelandic, there are considerably fewer feminine forms left in the language.

In comparison, Icelandic preserves almost all of the inflections of Old Norse and remains heavily inflected. It retains all the grammatical cases from Old Norse and is inflected for number and three different grammatical genders. The dual number forms are however almost completely lost in comparison to Old Norse.

Unlike other Germanic languages, nouns are inflected for definiteness in all Scandinavian languages, like in the following case for Norwegian (nynorsk):

Adjectives and participles are also inflected for definiteness in all Scandinavian languages like in Proto-Germanic.

Other Germanic languages
Modern German remains moderately inflected, retaining four noun cases, although the genitive started falling into disuse in all but formal writing in Early New High German. The case system of Dutch, simpler than that of German, is also simplified in common usage. Afrikaans, recognized as a distinct language in its own right rather than a Dutch dialect only in the early 20th century, has lost almost all inflection.

Latin and the Romance languages
The Romance languages, such as Spanish, Italian, French, Portuguese and especially - with its many cases - Romanian, have more overt inflection than English, especially in verb conjugation. Adjectives, nouns and articles are considerably less inflected than verbs, but they still have different forms according to number and grammatical gender.

Latin, the mother tongue of the Romance languages, was highly inflected; nouns and adjectives had different forms according to seven grammatical cases (including five major ones) with five major patterns of declension, and three genders instead of the two found in most Romance tongues. There were four patterns of conjugation in six tenses, three moods (indicative, subjunctive, imperative, plus the infinitive, participle, gerund, gerundive, and supine) and two voices (passive and active), all overtly expressed by affixes (passive voice forms were periphrastic in three tenses).

Baltic languages
The Baltic languages are highly inflected. Nouns and adjectives are declined in up to seven overt cases. Additional cases are defined in various covert ways. For example, an inessive case, an illative case, an adessive case and allative case are borrowed from Finnic. Latvian has only one overt locative case but it syncretizes the above four cases to the locative marking them by differences in the use of prepositions. Lithuanian breaks them out of the genitive case, accusative case and locative case by using different postpositions.

Dual form is obsolete in standard Latvian and nowadays it is also considered nearly obsolete in standard Lithuanian. For instance, in standard Lithuanian it is normal to say "dvi varnos (plural) – two crows" instead of "dvi varni (dual)". Adjectives, pronouns, and numerals are declined for number, gender, and case to agree with the noun they modify or for which they substitute. Baltic verbs are inflected for tense, mood, aspect, and voice. They agree with the subject in person and number (not in all forms in modern Latvian).

Slavic languages
All Slavic languages make use of a high degree of inflection, typically having six or seven cases and three genders for nouns and adjectives. However, the overt case system has disappeared almost completely in modern Bulgarian and Macedonian. Most verb tenses and moods are also formed by inflection (however, some are periphrastic, typically the future and conditional). Inflection is also present in adjective comparation and word derivation.

Declensional endings depend on case (nominative, genitive, dative, accusative, locative, instrumental, vocative), number (singular, dual or plural), gender (masculine, feminine, neuter) and animacy (animate vs inanimate). Unusual in other language families, declension in most Slavic languages also depends on whether the word is a noun or an adjective. Slovene and Sorbian languages use a rare third number, (in addition to singular and plural numbers) known as dual (in case of some words dual survived also in Polish and other Slavic languages). Modern Russian, Serbian and Czech also use a more complex form of dual, but this misnomer applies instead to numbers 2, 3, 4, and larger numbers ending in 2, 3, or 4 (with the exception of the teens, which are handled as plural; thus, 102 is dual, but 12 or 127 are not).
In addition, in some Slavic languages, such as Polish, word stems are frequently modified by the addition or absence of endings, resulting in consonant and vowel alternation.

Arabic (fusional)
Modern Standard Arabic (also called Literary Arabic) is an inflected language. It uses a system of independent and suffix pronouns classified by person and number and verbal inflections marking person and number. Suffix pronouns are used as markers of possession and as objects of verbs and prepositions. The tatweel (ـــ) marks where the verb stem, verb form, noun, or preposition is placed.

Arabic regional dialects (e.g. Moroccan Arabic, Egyptian Arabic, Gulf Arabic), used for everyday communication, tend to have less inflection than the more formal Literary Arabic.

In addition, the system known as ʾIʿrāb places vowel suffixes on each verb, noun, adjective, and adverb, according to its function within a sentence and its relation to surrounding words.

Uralic languages (agglutinative)
The Uralic languages are agglutinative, following from the agglutination in Proto-Uralic. The largest languages are Hungarian, Finnish, and Estonian—all European Union official languages. Uralic inflection is, or is developed from, affixing. Grammatical markers directly added to the word perform the same function as prepositions in English. Almost all words are inflected according to their roles in the sentence: verbs, nouns, pronouns, numerals, adjectives, and some particles.

Hungarian and Finnish, in particular, often simply concatenate suffixes. For example, Finnish talossanikinko "in my house, too?" consists of talo-ssa-ni-kin-ko. However, in the Finnic languages (Finnish, Estonian etc.) and the Sami languages, there are processes which affect the root, particularly consonant gradation. The original suffixes may disappear (and appear only by liaison), leaving behind the modification of the root. This process is extensively developed in Estonian and Sami, and makes them also inflected, not only agglutinating languages. The Estonian illative case, for example, is expressed by a modified root: maja → majja (historical form *maja-han).

Altaic languages (agglutinative)
The three language families often united as the Altaic languages—Turkic, Mongolic, and Manchu-Tungus—are agglutinative. The largest languages are Turkish, Azerbaijani and Uzbek—all Turkic languages. Altaic inflection is, or is developed from, affixing. Grammatical markers directly added to the word perform the same function as prepositions in English. Almost all words are inflected according to their roles in the sentence: verbs, nouns, pronouns, numerals, adjectives, and some particles.

Basque (agglutinative nominal inflection / fusional verb inflection)
Basque, a language isolate, is a highly inflected language, heavily inflecting both nouns and verbs.

Noun phrase morphology is agglutinative and consists of suffixes which simply attach to the end of a stem. These suffixes are in many cases fused with the article (-a for singular and -ak for plural), which in general is required to close a noun phrase in Basque if no other determiner is present, and unlike an article in many languages, it can only partially be correlated with the concept of definiteness. Proper nouns do not take an article, and indefinite nouns without the article (called mugagabe in Basque grammar) are highly restricted syntactically. Basque is an ergative language, meaning that inflectionally the single argument (subject) of an intransitive verb is marked in the same way as the direct object of a transitive verb. This is called the absolutive case and in Basque, as in most ergative languages, it is realized with a zero morph; in other words, it receives no special inflection. The subject of a transitive verb receives a special case suffix, called the ergative case.

There is no case marking concord in Basque and case suffixes, including those fused with the article, are added only to the last word in a noun phrase. Plurality is not marked on the noun and is identified only in the article or other determiner, possibly fused with a case marker. The examples below are in the absolutive case with zero case marking, and include the article only:

The noun phrase is declined for 11 cases: Absolutive, ergative, dative, possessive-genitive, benefactive, comitative, instrumental, inessive, allative, ablative, and local-genitive. These are signaled by suffixes that vary according to the categories of Singular, Plural, Indefinite, and Proper Noun, and many vary depending on whether the stem ends in a consonant or vowel. The Singular and Plural categories are fused with the article, and these endings are used when the noun phrase is not closed by any other determiner. This gives a potential 88 different forms, but the Indefinite and Proper Noun categories are identical in all but the local cases (inessive, allative, ablative, local-genitive), and many other variations in the endings can be accounted for by phonological rules operating to avoid impermissible consonant clusters. Local case endings are not normally added to animate Proper Nouns. The precise meaning of the local cases can be further specified by additional suffixes added after the local case suffixes.

Verb forms are extremely complex, agreeing with the subject, direct object, and indirect object; and include forms that agree with a "dative of interest" for intransitive verbs as well as allocutive forms where the verb form is altered if one is speaking to a close acquaintance. These allocutive forms also have different forms depending on whether the addressee is male or female. This is the only area in Basque grammar where gender plays any role at all. Subordination could also plausibly be considered an inflectional category of the Basque verb since subordination is signaled by prefixes and suffixes on the conjugated verb, further multiplying the number of potential forms.

Transitivity is a thoroughgoing division of Basque verbs, and it is necessary to know the transitivity of a particular verb in order to conjugate it successfully. In the spoken language only a handful of commonly used verbs are fully conjugated in the present and simple past, most verbs being conjugated by means of an auxiliary which differs according to transitivity. The literary language includes a few more such verbs, but the number is still very small. Even these few verbs require an auxiliary to conjugate other tenses besides the present and simple past.

The most common intransitive auxiliary is izan, which is also the verb for "to be". The most common transitive auxiliary is ukan, which is also the verb for "to have". (Other auxiliaries can be used in some of the tenses and may vary by dialect.) The compound tenses use an invariable form of the main verb (which appears in different forms according to the "tense group") and a conjugated form of the auxiliary. Pronouns are normally omitted if recoverable from the verb form. A couple of examples will have to suffice to demonstrate the complexity of the Basque verb:

The morphs that represent the various tense/person/case/mood categories of Basque verbs, especially in the auxiliaries, are so highly fused that segmenting them into individual meaningful units is nearly impossible, if not pointless. Considering the multitude of forms that a particular Basque verb can take, it seems unlikely that an individual speaker would have an opportunity to utter them all in his or her lifetime.

Mainland Southeast Asian languages (isolating)
Most languages in the Mainland Southeast Asia linguistic area (such as the varieties of Chinese, Vietnamese, and Thai) are not overtly inflected, or show very little overt inflection, and are therefore considered analytic languages (also known as isolating languages).

Chinese
Standard Chinese does not possess overt inflectional morphology. While some languages indicate grammatical relations with inflectional morphemes, Chinese utilizes word order and particles. Consider the following examples:

 Latin:
Puer puellam videt.
Puellam puer videt.

Both sentences mean 'The boy sees the girl.' This is because puer (boy) is singular nominative, puellam (girl) is singular accusative. Since the roles of puer and puellam have been marked with case endings, the change in position does not matter.

 Modern Standard Chinese:
我给了他一本书 (wǒ gěile tā yī běn shū) 'I gave him a book'
他给了我一本书 (tā gěile wǒ yī běn shū) 'He gave me a book'

The situation is very different in Chinese. Since Modern Chinese makes no use of inflection, the meanings of wǒ ('I' or 'me') and tā ('he' or 'him') shall be determined with their position.

In Classical Chinese, pronouns were overtly inflected to mark case.  However, these overt case forms are no longer used; most of the alternative pronouns are considered archaic in modern Mandarin Chinese.  Classically, 我 (wǒ) was used solely as the first person accusative.  吾 (Wú) was generally used as the first person nominative.

Certain varieties of Chinese are known to express meaning by means of tone change, although further investigations are required. Note that the tone change must be distinguished from tone sandhi. Tone sandhi is a compulsory change that occurs when certain tones are juxtaposed. Tone change, however, is a morphologically conditioned alternation and is used as an inflectional or a derivational strategy. Examples from Taishan and Zhongshan (both Yue dialects spoken in Guangdong Province) are shown below:

 Taishan

 Zhongshan

The following table compares the personal pronouns of Sixian dialect (a dialect of Taiwanese Hakka) with Zaiwa and Jingpho (both Tibeto-Burman languages spoken in Yunnan and Burma). The superscripted numbers indicate the Chao tone numerals.

In Shanghainese, the third-person singular pronoun is overtly inflected as to case and the first- and second-person singular pronouns exhibit a change in tone depending on case.

Japanese (agglutinative)
Japanese shows a high degree of overt inflection of verbs, less so of adjectives, and very little of nouns, but it is mostly strictly agglutinative and extremely regular. Formally, every noun phrase must be marked for case, but this is done by invariable particles (clitic postpositions). (Many grammarians consider Japanese particles to be separate words, and therefore not an inflection, while others consider agglutination a type of overt inflection, and therefore consider Japanese nouns as overtly inflected.)

Auxiliary languages
Some auxiliary languages, such as Lingua Franca Nova, Glosa, and Frater, have no inflection. Other auxiliary languages, such as Esperanto, Ido, and Interlingua have comparatively simple inflectional systems.

Esperanto

In Esperanto, an agglutinative language, nouns and adjectives are inflected for case (nominative, accusative) and number (singular, plural), according to a simple paradigm without irregularities. Verbs are not inflected for person or number, but they are inflected for tense (past, present, future) and mood (indicative, infinitive, conditional, jussive). They also form active and passive participles, which may be past, present or future. All verbs are regular.

Ido
Ido has a different form for each verbal tense (past, present, future, volitive and imperative) plus an infinitive, and both a present and past participle. There are though no verbal inflections for person or number, and all verbs are regular.

Nouns are marked for number (singular and plural), and the accusative case may be shown in certain situations, typically when the direct object of a sentence precedes its verb. On the other hand, adjectives are unmarked for gender, number or case (unless they stand on their own, without a noun, in which case they take on the same desinences as the missing noun would have taken). The definite article "la" ("the") remains unaltered regardless of gender or case, and also of number, except when there is no other word to show plurality. Pronouns are identical in all cases, though exceptionally the accusative case may be marked, as for nouns.

Interlingua
Interlingua, in contrast with the Romance languages, has almost no irregular verb conjugations, and its verb forms are the same for all persons and numbers. It does, however, have compound verb tenses similar to those in the Romance, Germanic, and Slavic languages: ille ha vivite, "he has lived"; illa habeva vivite, "she had lived". Nouns are inflected by number, taking a plural -s, but rarely by gender: only when referring to a male or female being. Interlingua has no noun-adjective agreement by gender, number, or case. As a result, adjectives ordinarily have no inflections. They may take the plural form if they are being used in place of a noun: le povres, "the poor".

See also
Agreement (linguistics)
Diction
 Intonation (linguistics)
 Introflection
Lexeme
Marker (linguistics)
Morpheme
Nominal TAM
Periphrasis
Righthand head rule
Suppletion
Synthetic language
Tense–aspect–mood
Uninflected word
Linguistic relativity

Notes

Citations

Footnotes

References

Further reading

External links

SIL articles

 SIL: What is inflection?
 SIL: What is an inflectional affix?
 SIL: What is an inflectional category?
 SIL: What is a morphological process?
 SIL: What is derivation?
 SIL: Comparison of inflection and derivation
 SIL: What is an agglutinative language?
 SIL: What is a fusional language?
 SIL: What is an isolating language?
 SIL: What is a polysynthetic language?

Lexicon of Linguistics articles
 Lexicon of Linguistics: Agglutinating Language, Fusional Morphology, Isolating Language, Polysynthetic Language
 Lexicon of Linguistics: Inflection, Derivation
 Lexicon of Linguistics: Conjugation, Declension
 Lexicon of Linguistics: Base, Stem, Root
 Lexicon of Linguistics: Defective Paradigm
 Lexicon of Linguistics: Strong Verb
 Lexicon of Linguistics: Inflection Phrase (IP), INFL, AGR, Tense
 Lexicon of Linguistics: Lexicalist Hypothesis

Grammar
Linguistic morphology
Linguistics terminology